Michael Simon may refer to:

 Michael Simon (ceramic artist) (born 1947), noted American ceramic artist
 Michael Simon (DJ) (born 1972), German DJ and musician
 Michael B Simon, American entrepreneur
 Michael H. Simon (born 1956), American attorney and federal judge in the state of Oregon
 Mickaël Simon (born 1987), French rugby league player
 Michael Simon (stage director) (born 1958), German stage director
 Michael A. Simon (born 1960), American television and film director, writer, and producer
 Mike Simon (1883–1963), American Major League Baseball player
 Mikey Simon, main character of the American animated television sitcom Kappa Mikey
 Michael Symon (born 1969), American chef
 Mike Symon (born 1965), Australian politician
 Michael Simon (diplomat), Israeli diplomat
 Michael Anthony Simon, American artist